The 2022 CEBL–U Sports Draft is the Fourth CEBL Draft, being revealed on April 19. 10 Canadian Elite Basketball League (CEBL) teams will select 20 athletes in total.

Format
the draft order for the first round is determine by how the teams finished in the 2021 CEBL season and the 3 new expansion team order of joining the league, followed by Saskatchewan Rattlers finishing last place last season so they get fourth overall. A "snake draft" was used, with the order reversing in even-numbered rounds, and the original order in odd-numbered rounds. The draft order for the first round was determined as follows: 
Scarborough Shooting Stars
Montreal Alliance
Newfoundland Growlers
Saskatchewan Rattlers
Ottawa Blackjacks
Guelph Nighthawks
Fraser Valley Bandits
Hamilton Honey Badgers
Niagara River Lions
Edmonton Stingers

Eligibility
Same thing as in 2021, Players may completed their university eligibility in 2020-21, or they may be returning to their university team in the fall and be classified within the CEBL’s U SPORTS Developmental player program. They must qualify as Canadian, and they must have completed at least one full year of eligibility at their U SPORTS institution. Each CEBL club must have at least one U SPORTS player on its 10-man active roster at all times.

Player selection
Source:

Round 1

Round 2

References

Canadian Elite Basketball League
2021–22 in Canadian basketball